Paulo Roberto Freire da Costa (born 4 February 1955) is a Brazilian politician and pastor. He has spent his political career representing São Paulo, having served as state representative since 2011.

Personal life
Freire Costa was born to José Wellington Bezerra da Costa and Vanda Freire Costa. His father José was a pastor of the Assembleias de Deus church. He has 5 siblings: José Wellington, Samuel, Joel, Marta, and Rute. His sister Marta is also a politician, and his brother José Wellington is also a pastor. Freire Costa is married to Léa Costa and has two daughters: Vanessa and Cristiane, as well as three grandchildren. Like his father and brother he is also a pastor in the Assembleias de Deus church. Because of his faith Freire Costa is strongly opposed to abortion.

Political career
Freire Costa voted in favor of the impeachment against then-president Dilma Rousseff and political reformation. He would later vote in against opening a corruption investigation against Rousseff's successor Michel Temer, and voted in favor of the 2017 Brazilian labor reforms.

References

1955 births
Living people
People from São Paulo
Liberal Party (Brazil, 2006) politicians
Democrats (Brazil) politicians
Liberal Front Party (Brazil) politicians
Brazilian Labour Party (current) politicians
Brazilian Assemblies of God pastors
Members of the Chamber of Deputies (Brazil) from São Paulo